Domecelle is a village in the municipality of San Xoán de Río in Ourense in the Galicia region of north-west Spain.
It is located in the north-east of the province.

Towns in Spain